The Round Valley Ensphere is a wooden-dome stadium in Eagar, Arizona, USA. It is owned by Round Valley High School and the Round Valley Unified School District. It is the only domed high school football stadium in the United States. Opened in 1991–92 at a cost of US$11 million, the venue seats 5,500 people for football and 9,000 for basketball and volleyball.

History
In 1987, a $12 million bond for the dome and repairs was floated and passed after it was found that Tucson Electric Power, which operates a generating station in the area, would have to pay for $11 million of it. (Since the utility generates 90% of the property values in the area, it pays 90% of the property taxes.) TEP, at the time facing financial issues, sued to block construction, but trial and appellate courts rejected the lawsuit.

Construction began in the summer of 1990. It was forced to stop for three months for reinspection when two workers were hit by wooden beams and fell 75 feet to their deaths.

The dome held its first football game on October 11, 1991, featuring the Payson High School Longhorns.

The venue was closed in 2015 due to water damage and remained closed for nearly a year. The water damage was caused when heavy rains brought water into the building through the exterior doors. The damage to the synthetic turf in the facility produced elevated levels of mercury vapor, which required the facility to undergo professional remediation. After playing outside for the 2015 season, the Round Valley team returned to the dome for football games in 2016.

Structure
The Ensphere encloses  of space and was the first fully day-lighted dome of its kind, allowing light and heat to enter.

Uses

School
In addition to football, the facility is used for basketball, track and field, and soccer.

Non-school
The dome is also used for nonschool events, such as a car show. In 2002, as a result of the Rodeo-Chediski fire, the second-largest in Arizona history, the dome was used as a shelter. It took in 9,800 evacuees, tripling Eagar's population overnight, Jhett Hamblin, and  President George W. Bush visited the shelter. The absorption of so many people almost caused the town's sewage system to be overloaded.

In 2016, the Cedar Fire prompted evacuations in Pinetop, for which the Round Valley Dome was made available as an evacuation site.

See also
Walkup Skydome – another wooden dome in Arizona, built in 1977 for athletics and other uses
Tacoma Dome, 1983 ensphere-design arena built for a much larger capacity

References

Buildings and structures in Apache County, Arizona
Covered stadiums in the United States
Geodesic domes
Indoor arenas in Arizona
Volleyball venues in the United States
Basketball venues in Arizona
American football venues in Arizona
Sports venues in Arizona
Tourist attractions in Apache County, Arizona
Sports venues completed in 1991
1991 establishments in Arizona